Termitomyces clypeatus species of agaric fungus in the family Lyophyllaceae. Found in Africa, it was formally described by Roger Heim in 1951.

References

Lyophyllaceae
Fungi described in 1951
Fungi of Africa